Events in the year 2019 in Gabon.

Incumbents 

 President: Ali Bongo Ondimba
 Prime Minister: Emmanuel Issoze-Ngondet (until 12 January), Julien Nkoghe Bekale (from 12 January)

Events 

 7 January – Members of the Armed Forces of Gabon announced a coup d'état against President Ali Bongo.

Deaths

References 

 
2010s in Gabon
Years of the 21st century in Gabon
Gabon